A/S J. Ludwig Mowinckels Rederi is a Bergen-based shipping company that operates eight tankers with six newbuildings.  The company is privately owned and has divided ownership between one foundation and the Mowinckel family through the founder's J. Ludwig Mowinckel's wife Julie Mowinckel's will and testament - still after 30 years waiting to be settled. The foundation "Magda Muller Mowincels Legat" was set up in 1985 by Magda Mowinckel - the daughter of the founder - and aims to protect and serve for the company's economy and existence.

The portfolio consists of product tankers, shuttle tankers, and chemical tankers. Two newbuildings are bulk carriers. These vessels are registered in the Norwegian International Ship Register, the Norwegian Ship Register, on the Bahamas and on Malta. Chaterers include ExxonMobil, Statoil and Teekay.

References

Shipping companies of Norway
Dry bulk shipping companies
Tanker shipping companies
Transport companies of Vestland
Companies based in Bergen
Transport companies established in 1898
1898 establishments in Norway